Bahar in Persian appears as a feminine given name in Iran, Afghanistan and Turkey. It comes from the Middle Persian whʾl (wahār), which ultimately comes from Proto-Indo-European *wósr̥ (“spring”).

A similar name also appears in the Semitic languages albeit with a different meaning. Therefore, Baħar in Maltese; Al-Bahr in Arabic; and Bahir ( in Amharic - Bahari /  in Tigrinya).

People with the given name Bahar 
 Amina Gul-Bahar (c. 1434–1492), the first wife of Ottoman Sultan Mehmed II
 Ahmad Bahar (1889–1957), Iranian statesman
 Bahar Çağlar (born 1988), Turkish basketballer
 Bahar Doğan (born 1974), Turkish long-distance runner
 Bahar Güvenç (born 1997), Turkish footballer
 Bahar Kizil (born 1988), German singer of Turkish descent
 Bahar Mert (born 1975), Turkish volleyball player
 Bahar Movahed Bashiri (born 1979), Iranian portrait caricaturist, classical vocalist and dentist
 Bahar Soomekh (born 1975), Iranian-American actor
 Bahar Toksoy (born 1988), Turkish volleyball player

People with the surname Bahar 
 Dany Bahar (born 1971), Turkish chief executive
 Emran bin Bahar (born 1961), Bruneian diplomat
 Hatice Bahar Özgüvenç (born 1984), Turkish footballer
 Mehrdad Bahar (1930–1994), Iranian linguist, mythologist and Persian historian
 Mohammad-Taqi Bahar (1884–1951), Iranian poet, politician, historian and journalist
 Mojdeh Bahar, American patent attorney and government official
 R. Iris Bahar, American professor and electronics engineer
 Salah Al Bahar, Iraqi singer and composer
 Qazi Mu'tasim Billah Bahar (1933–2013), Bangladeshi Islamic scholar and professor

See also 
 Bahar (disambiguation)

Persian feminine given names
Turkish feminine given names
Pakistani feminine given names